Fajfrić is a Serbian surname. It is found in villages located in Šid. It may refer to:

Petar Fajfrić, Yugoslav handball player
Željko Fajfrić, Serbian academic, lawyer and author
Bojan Fajfrić, Serbian visual artist
Miljka Fajfrić,

Serbian surnames